Maria Erlinda Lucille Termulo-Padilla (born Maria Erlinda Lucille Sazon Termulo; August 10, 1984) professionally known as Mariel Rodriguez-Padilla or simply Mariel Rodriguez, is a Filipino-born American commercial model, endorser, television host, VJ and actress.

Early life
Mariel Rodriguez was born Maria Erlinda Lucille Sazon Termulo on August 10, 1984. She is known by the nickname "Mariel" as a child, lived and was raised by her maternal grandparents in Parañaque due to her parents' separation at her youth. She studied at De La Salle Santiago Zobel School for grade school and high school and attended De La Salle University for college, where she graduated with a Bachelor of Arts in Philippine Studies, major in Filipino in Mass Media.

Rodriguez has one sister and two half-siblings. Her sister, Kaye Garcia, owns the clothing line Hot Pink Lingerie. Her half-siblings, Ethan and Julia Termulo, both live in New Jersey.

Career
Rodriguez started her career at the age of 15 as a commercial model, which included Clean & Clear. In 2004, she was cast in MTV Asia's television show Rouge. Introducing herself through the webcam, she flew to Singapore for the audition and got the part. Her role in the show caught the eye of MTV Philippines executives and was made a VJ in December 2004. She left MTV in April 2006.

GMA Network signed her as one of their stars. While in the network, she became one of the regular hosts of Extra Challenge, and appeared on the series Love to Love.

In 2005, Rodriguez moved to ABS-CBN, where she joined as a co-host of the competition series Pinoy Big Brother until 2010. Later, she became well known for co-hosting the noon-time programs Wowowee (2006–10), Pilipinas Win Na Win (2010), and Happy Yipee Yehey! (2011). Additionally, Rodriguez also acted in the Komiks series Varga in 2008, where she starred in the titular main role as Varga, and two installments of the Precious Hearts Romances Presents, namely Bud Brothers and Love Is Only in the Movies, in 2009 and Cinco 2010, respectively.

In September 2011, she moved to TV5, where she continued her co-hosting stint for Willie Revillame's variety show Wil Time Bigtime from 2011 to 2013, which upon its cancellation was followed by Wowowillie, which she continued to co-host.

In November 2015, she returned to ABS-CBN and reprised her role as co-host in Pinoy Big Brother: 737, which also serves as the reunion of Kuya's Angels together with Toni Gonzaga and Bianca Gonzalez respectively. She also appeared in 737 as a celebrity houseguest, alongside Enchong Dee and Karla Estrada.

In 2015, Rodriguez was tapped as the guest host of It's Showtime along with Amy Perez. Weeks later, she confirmed their official participation on the show as main co-hosts.

Personal life
Rodriguez is an American citizen. She married actor-director Robin Padilla at the Taj Mahal in Agra, India on August 19, 2010. They had met on the Philippine noon time variety show Wowowee when Padilla was temporarily a presenter.  Rodriguez, a Catholic, did not convert to Islam following her marriage with Padilla, who is a Muslim.

In March 2015, Rodriguez revealed that she had suffered a miscarriage, which would have been her first child with Padilla. In August 2015, Padilla announced that he and Rodriguez were expecting triplets. However, a few weeks after the announcement, a statement was released from Padilla's manager that Rodriguez had suffered a second miscarriage.

On May 21, 2016, on an episode of It's Showtime, Rodriguez announced that she was pregnant for the third time. On August 13, 2016, it was announced that she and Padilla will have a daughter, due in November. Their daughter, Maria Isabella, was born on November 14, 2016, in Delaware. She also gave birth to her 2nd child named Maria Gabriela who was born on November 15, 2019, in United States.

In September 2022, Rodriguez officially signed a contract with AMBS to be part of the new Channel 2 TV Station, ALLTV.

Filmography

Film

Television

References

1984 births
Living people
VJs (media personalities)
American actresses of Filipino descent
American models of Filipino descent
Filipino Roman Catholics
Filipino television actresses
Filipino film actresses
Filipino television variety show hosts
Filipino people of Spanish descent
Mariel
GMA Network personalities
ABS-CBN personalities
Star Magic
TV5 (Philippine TV network) personalities
De La Salle University alumni
21st-century American women
Filipino women comedians